Shari Thurer is a psychoanalytically trained psychologist practicing in Boston and an adjunct associate professor at Boston University.

Select publications
She is the author of The Myths of Motherhood: How Culture Reinvents the Good Mother  and The End of Gender: A Psychological Autopsy

References

External links
Official site

American women psychologists
21st-century American psychologists
American non-fiction writers
Boston University faculty
Year of birth missing (living people)
Living people
American women academics
21st-century American women